Kaistia hirudinis is a Gram-negative and rod-shaped bacterium from the genus of Kaistia which has been isolated from a leech (Hirudo verbana) from the Leech Breeding Station in Biebertal in Germany.

References

External links
Type strain of Kaistia hirudinis at BacDive -  the Bacterial Diversity Metadatabase	

Hyphomicrobiales
Bacteria described in 2013